Mount Adair is a prominent  double summit mountain located in the Kenai Mountains, on the Kenai Peninsula, in the U.S. state of Alaska. The east summit is higher than the 4,940-foot west peak. Precipitation runoff from the mountain drains into Kenai Lake. Mount Adair's local name was reported in 1951 by the U.S. Geological Survey.

Climate
Based on the Köppen climate classification, Mount Adair is located in a subarctic climate zone with long, cold, snowy winters, and mild summers. Temperatures can drop below −20 °C with wind chill factors below −30 °C. This climate supports a spruce and hemlock forest on the lower slopes.

See also

List of mountain peaks of Alaska
Geology of Alaska

References

External links
 Mount Adair Weather forecast

Adair
Adair
Adair
Adair